GeoMesa is an open-source, distributed, spatio-temporal index built on top of Bigtable-style databases using an implementation of the Geohash algorithm.

Description
Written in Scala, GeoMesa is capable of ingesting, indexing, and querying billions of geometry features using a highly parallelized index scheme. GeoMesa builds on top of open source geo (OSG) libraries. It implements the GeoTools DataStore interface providing standardized access to feature collections as well as implementing a GeoServer plugin.

Google announced that GeoMesa supported the Google Cloud Bigtable hosted NoSQL service in their release blog post in May 2015. GeoMesa also supports Bigtable-derivative implementations Apache Accumulo and  Apache HBase.
GeoMesa implements a Z-order curve via a custom Geohash implementation to combine three dimensions of geometry and time (i.e. latitude/longitude/timestamp) into a single-dimension lexicographic key space provided by Accumulo.

References

External links

GeoMesa Source
LocationTech homepage
Geowave

Hadoop
Free software programmed in Scala
Bigtable implementations